Dr. Paul McKee (October 14, 1898 – November 26, 1974) was a university professor, a writer of children's books, and was regarded as "one of the most eminent scholars in his field".  McKee earned a doctorate at the University of Iowa before joining the faculty at the University of Northern Colorado.

Books

 A Primer for Parents
 English for Meaning 3
 English for Meaning 4
 English for Meaning 6
 English for Meaning 8
 Primer for Parents: How Your Child Learns to Read
 Reading and Literature in the Elementary School
 Reading for Meaning 1
 Reading: A Program of Instruction for the Elementary School
 Sky Lines
 The Teaching of Reading in the Elementary School

Reading for Meaning series

 Bright Peaks
 Climbing Higher
 Come Along
 Getting Ready to Read: A Pre-Reading Program
 High Roads
 Looking Ahead
 On We Go
 The Big Show
 Tip
 Tip and Mitten
 Up and Away
 With Jack and Janet

Language for Meaning series
 Building Your Language
 Communicating Ideas
 Enriching Your Language
 Improving Your Language
 Let's Talk
 Making Words Work
 Mastering Your Language
 Perfecting Your Language
 Sharing Experiences

References

1898 births
University of Iowa alumni
1974 deaths
University of Northern Colorado faculty
20th-century American male writers